Weston is a neighbourhood and former village in Toronto, Ontario, Canada. The neighbourhood is situated in the northwest of the city, south of Highway 401, east of the Humber River, north of Eglinton Avenue, and west of Jane Street. Weston Road just north of Lawrence Avenue is the commercial core of Weston, with many small businesses and services. Weston was incorporated as a village in the 19th century and was absorbed into the Borough of York in the late 1960s. York itself was amalgamated into Toronto in 1998.

Description

Weston's building stock consists mostly of Victorian homes east of the railway with apartment and condominium towers on Weston Road overlooking the Humber River valley. Weston's main shopping district is located on Weston Road between Church Street in the north and Wilby Crescent (just south of Lawrence Avenue) in the south. Most buildings in this area reflect early-mid-20th century Ontario town architecture, brick buildings with decorative masonry. The area has a noteworthy library (previously a Mechanics' Institute and Carnegie library). The community is dotted with grand old churches with architectural significance. There has been a recent move in Weston to designate certain areas as a historical district.

Most streets in Weston are lined with tall mature trees, some well over 100 years old. This is more common east of the railway tracks. Recently, there has been some infill development on former industrial and commercial lands bringing some new housing stock to the area. On April 26, 2013, a fire was accidentally started at 2304 Weston Road, due to tar during roof construction.

History 
The first European settlement in the Weston area took place in the 1790s, when a saw mill was built in Etobicoke Township on an old native trading path along the west side of the Humber River, named after the well-known Humber estuary in Yorkshire, England. In 1815 James Farr, a prominent local mill owner, named the growing settlement "Weston" after his birthplace, Weston, Hertfordshire. Weston initially developed along both sides of the river until a disastrous flood in 1850 destroyed the west bank settlement. The former west bank settlement is now the site of the Weston Golf and Country Club. Improvements to the Main Street, now Weston Road, and the 1856 arrival of the Grand Trunk Railway brought growth on the east side.

The first post office was opened in 1842. The first library opened in 1858, a Mechanic's Institute. In 1865, the Trinity College School opened, founded by William Arthur Johnson. It was located in Weston near the old Mill and at a home further north until 1867. It relocated to Port Hope, Ontario in 1868.

A second railway company arrived in 1869. On October 5, 1869, Prince Arthur, Duke of Connaught and Strathearn attended the sod turning ceremony for the construction of the Toronto, Grey and Bruce Railway. The spade which he used for the event is kept in the public library.

The town of Weston grew, and over the 19th century became an important industrial centre for the Toronto area. The symbol adopted for the town, an outline of an old-fashioned bicycle, was based on this history of manufacturing and especially the old CCM bicycle factory on Lawrence Avenue just east of Weston Road. Models of bicycles now hang from the streetlights along Weston Road.

Weston was incorporated as a village in 1881, and then as a town in 1914. In 1914, the town also saw the opening of Weston Public Library, a Carnegie library. This building is now recognized with heritage status.

In October 1954, Hurricane Hazel flooded the Humber River valley, causing death and destruction of property. In response, low-lying areas in the Humber River valley were converted to parkland and property zoning standards were changed across Ontario to avoid building encroachment on floodplains. There is a memorial in the south end of Lions Park near a pedestrian bridge which incorporates the original footing of a bridge that once crossed the Humber. The other footing of the bridge is the square chunk of concrete that is in the middle of the river nearby.

In 1967, it became part of the Borough (later City) of York. In 1998, York was in turn amalgamated with the five other members of Metropolitan Toronto, (Toronto, Etobicoke, North York, East York, and Scarborough) in the new "megacity" of Toronto. Vocal lobbying at the time allowed Weston to retain many street names which are exact duplicates of downtown streets, including Church Street, King Street and John Street.

Airport link controversy 
The Union Pearson Express between Toronto Pearson International Airport and Union Station downtown was a hot political issue in Weston. It had originally been proposed for completion by 2009. Weston is currently a station stop on the Kitchener line operated by GO Transit and additional airport trains would stop there. The link would see the construction of three additional tracks through the neighbourhood and increased rail traffic more than fourfold. Community activists worried about how the link would sever the community (vehicle traffic on John Street will be permanently blocked from crossing the tracks, replaced by a pedestrian bridge) and the possibility of lower future property values due to increased noise and diesel fumes.

It was an issue during the Canadian federal election held on January 23, 2006, when incumbent Liberal Member of Parliament, Alan Tonks, supported the link, while the other candidates opposed it. It was also an issue in the February 2007 provincial by-election, where all local candidates came out against the link, but which was still supported by the governing Liberals. The Weston Community Coalition (WCC) had proposed a subway line as an alternative to run through the Weston rail corridor to the airport that would have stops along the way which would serve many communities throughout Toronto and be operated by the TTC rather than a private company. Various other alternatives were presented by community activists such as an Eglinton subway to the airport, an LRT alternative, or a route down Highway 427.

In the end, the tracks went into a trench with bridges overhead to prevent bisecting the neighbourhood. A "rail deck park" allowed the expansion of a Toronto Catholic school playground over the tracks.

Demographics
In 2016, the Weston neighbourhood was home to 17,992 residents. 60% of the population speak English as their first language, 6.4% speak Spanish, 4.8% speak Portuguese, 4.3% speak Somali and 3.1% speak Italian.

Major racial and ethnic populations (2016): 
 38.0% White; 8.8% Italian, 8.3% British, 7.4% Scottish
 33.6% Black; 13.1% Jamaican, 6.0% Somali, 4.9% other African Canadian (including Black Nova Scotian)
 7.7% Latin American (of any race)
 4.3% South Asian
 3.3% Filipino

 Transportation 

Main throughfares serving Weston are Lawrence Avenue West and Weston Road. A number of local roads in Weston resulted in name duplication after Toronto amalgamation in 1998:

 John Street - a residential street from Jane Street to Weston Road has same name as the more famous John Street. The section just east of S Station Street is now cut off after Union Pearson Express was built; the previous level crossing replaced with pedestrian bridge over trench with tracks below.
 King Street - a residential street from Jane Street to Weston Road has same name as the more famous King Street downtown.
 Church Street - a residential street from Jane Street to Weston Road has same name as the more famous Church Street downtown.

 Public transportation 

Weston falls within the service area of the Toronto Transit Commission (TTC). Transit is provided entirely by buses linking to the subway system. The 32 Eglinton West, 35 Jane, 52 Lawrence West, 59 Maple Leaf, 73 Royal York, 79 Scarlett, and 89 Weston all pass through the boundaries of Weston.

As of January 2012, all TTC bus routes serving Weston are accessible. Routes 52 and 352 were the final TTC bus routes to be made accessible, with the retirement of the last GMC New Look "Fishbowl" buses in December 2011. Although all bus routes are accessible, individual stops along the routes may not meet accessibility standards.

The Metrolinx Weston GO Station is located at Weston Road and Lawrence Avenue. The station is served by the Kitchener line (which connects Kitchener, Ontario to downtown Toronto during rush hours) and the Union Pearson Express (all-day service between Toronto Pearson International Airport and downtown Toronto). The Weston GO Station is wheelchair accessible.

 Recreation 
The Weston Farmers' Market opens weekly from mid-May to the end of October near the centre of Weston. The Weston BIA also hosts a Harvest Festival around Thanksgiving in October, and the Weston Santa Claus Parade each November.

Weston has many small parks throughout but most notable is Cruickshank Park in the Humber River valley with many mature trees and paved bicycle paths lined with large weeping willow trees. The bicycle path continues south to Lake Ontario. Sometimes salmon can be seen swimming upstream in the river. The park has a population of beaver as can be seen from the tell-tale marks left behind on trees. In order to protect some trees, park staff have wrapped the tree trunks with wire screen in some areas. There are also some frogs closer to the water's edge and garter snakes hidden away in the more secluded areas. Canada geese, loons, mallards and seagulls are a common sight. Herons have also been spotted looking for fish in the river.

In some areas of the park, you can see exposed sedimentary rock in the walls of the valley, made visible by the action of glaciers that carved out the valley during the last glacial period about 20,000 years ago. The same rock was used to build many stone retaining walls throughout the town; an example of this use can be seen on the south end of the Lawrence Avenue bridge in the north end of Lions Park.

Weston Lions Park, located south of Lawrence Avenue, fills  and contains facilities for playing football, rugby union, soccer, tennis, and baseball, as well as an ice rink, swimming pool, basketball court and skatepark.

 Weston Arena 

Originally as Weston Arena, it is now known as either Weston Lions Arena or Weston Lions Recreation Arena. The arena was proposed on what was the Weston Fairgrounds in 1944, opened in 1949 and gained a pool in 1959.

The arena hosted the Toronto Dixie Beehives of the Ontario Junior Hockey League from 2007 to 2009. The arena currently hosts the Weston Minor Hockey League and Weston Dodgers.

Reeves of the Village of Weston
 1881-1886 William TyrrellCOUNTY AND CITY: The Government Interviewed by a County Deputation JUDICIAL SEPARATION AMD ANNEXATION CHANGE OF VENUE CASES RIVERSIDE ANNEXATION
The Globe (1844-1936); Toronto, Ont. [Toronto, Ont]18 Feb 1884: 8.
 1886-1889 Thomas R. WadsworthTHE MUNICIPALITIES: NOMINATIONS IN OUTSIDE CITIES AND TOWNS Mayoralty Contests In Many Places--The Contest In Ottawa--A Quiet Nomination Day KINGSTON OTTAWA BRANTFORD ST. CATHARINES BELLEVILLE GUELPH STRATFORD BROCKVILLE BARRIE WINDSOR OWEN SOUND CHATHAM COBOURG WOODSTOCK ST. MARY'S DUNDAS
The Globe (1844-1936); Toronto, Ont. [Toronto, Ont]27 Dec 1887: 1.
 1892-1894 William TyrrellMUNICIPAL ELECTIONS: Successful Candidates Throughout the Province SOME KEEN CONTESTS Many Temperance By Laws Defeated SURPRISES IN THE CITIES Representatives in Villages and Townships THE HONOR ROLL IN THE TOWNS-- MANY NEW FACES AT THE COUNCIL BOARDS BELLEVILLE ST. CATHARINES KINGSTON ST. THOMAS WINDSOR GUELPH BRANTFORD VILLAGES AMD TOWNSEITS LIVE STOCK MARKETS The Globe (1844-1936); Toronto, Ont. [Toronto, Ont]03 Jan 1893: 7.
1895-1897 Jacob BullWEST YORK FARMERS: Annual Meeting of Their Institute at Weston A SUCCESSFUL GATHERING Fruit Culture and Stock Raising Discussed Simpson Rennie, Robert Thompson and Prof, Harcourt the Principal Speakers-- Meeting at Woodbridge To-day AFTERNOON SESSION GOOD ROADS SWINE BREEDING
The Globe (1844-1936); Toronto, Ont. [Toronto, Ont]03 Jan 1895: 2.
1898-1900 Dr. W.J. CharltonCARS: The Village of Weston in a Sad Plight DEADLOCK OVER A RAILWAY Citizens Indignant at the Council By the Latter's Action the Elecric cars Stop at the Limits of the Village-- citizens Association Formed A Bit of History The Electric Railway The Cars Locked Out A Kick From the Citizens Saturday Evening's Meeting The Speeches Rights of British Citizens
The Globe (1844-1936); Toronto, Ont. [Toronto, Ont]12 Sep 1898: 5.
1902 J. Conron
1903-1906 Jacob BullREJECTED LOCAL OPTION
The Globe (1844-1936); Toronto, Ont. [Toronto, Ont]05 Dec 1903: 28.
1907 Dr. E.F. Irwin
1908-1913 R.J. BullFull TextHistorical Newspapers
WOULD HAVE W. H. PUGSLEY APPOINTED TO THE SENATE: York County Council Pays a Striking Tribute to Reeve of Richmond Hill
The Globe (1844-1936); Toronto, Ont. [Toronto, Ont]30 Jan 1913: 9.WESTERN ONTARIO ALMOST A UNIT IN FAVOR OF NIAGARA POWER SCHEME: Municipal Elections ... Universal Interest OWEN SOUND ANTIS' BIG WIN Mayor Kennedy, Who is Not a Policeman, Re-elected Many By-laws Carried, Including Some For Important Public Works --Mayors of the More Important Centres-- The Vote on the Power By-law a Remarkably Heavy One
The Globe (1844-1936); Toronto, Ont. [Toronto, Ont]07 Jan 1908: 1.
1914 Dr. E.F. Irwin

Mayors of the Town of Weston

The mayor and council sat at Weston Town Hall (Dufferin Hall) at corner of Little Avenue and Weston Road (since demolished and now a parking lot).

 1914-1918 Dr. W. J. Charlton
 1919-1920 John Gardhouse - prominent cattle breeder who was inducted into the Canadian Agricultural Hall of Fame, and co-founder of the Royal Agricultural Winter Fair. Served on Etobicoke's town council, including three terms as reeve, prior to moving to Weston, and as Warden of York County. Later served as chair of the Toronto Board of Education in 1917.John Gardhouse Passes
HON DUNCAN MARSHALL.The Globe (1844-1936); Toronto, Ont. [Toronto, Ont]03 Jan 1930: 47. In 2003, his neighbourhood organized to have his home and stable designated a heritage site and save it from demolition.PROMINENT BREEDER PASSES AT WESTON AFTER SHORT ILLNESS: John Gardhouse Was Director of Exhibition and Famous Judge YEARS IN PUBLIC LIFE
The Globe (1844-1936); Toronto, Ont. [Toronto, Ont]01 Jan 1930: 13. 
 1921-1925 Robert John Flynn
 1926-1928 George Sainsbury
 1929-1930 A. Lorne Coulter
 1931 W. J. Pollett
 1932-1934 Sam J. Totten
 1935-1936 Frank Walton Mertens
 1937-1939 George Benjamin Evans
 1940-1942 Gordon S. Harris
 1942-1945 John P. Allan
 1946-1948 Thomas Dougherty
 1949 Kenneth L. Thompson - first elected to Weston council in 1939. Served a term as Warden of York County in 1948. Ran unsuccessfully as a Liberal candidate in the 1949, 1953, and 1957 federal elections. Thompson owned his own insurance company and was an underwriter for Canada Life. While warden, he was instrumental in introducing trolley buses into Toronto's transit system. He served as chairman of the York Planning Board in the 1960s.Kenneth L. Thompson Weston mayor ran for Liberals, The Globe and Mail; Toronto, Ont. [Toronto, Ont]05 Feb 1981: P.68.
 1950-1954 Richard C. Seagrave- born in London, England, Seagrave came to Canada at the age of 2. At 15, he started working for the Great North-Western Telegraph Company (later CN Telegraph) rising from office boy to administrative assistant to the general manager. He was also on the board of the Canadian National Exhibition.
 1955-1958 Harry Clark - Clark suggested renaming the Lakeshore Expressway after Metro Chairman Fred Gardiner
 1959-1960 Jack L. Holley - a pilot with Trans-Canada Airlines, Holley retired from office as his job did provide him enough time to spend on his mayoralty duties.
 1961-1964 George W. Bull - a local lawyer, Bull was a member of one of Weston's founding families
 1965-1966 Charles Wesley Boddington - after amalgamation, he served on York's Board of Control for a term. Boddington lost an arm and a leg during World War II after the bomber he was flying exploded over Düsseldorf, and spent the rest of the war in a POW camp. He set up a motor vehicle licensing bureau in Weston in 1947 which he ran until his death in 1984. He ran as a Progressive Conservative candidate in York West in the 1968 Canadian federal election, placing third. In 1969, he ran for mayor of York, but lost to Phil White. He was named to the Order of Canada in 1977.

 Notable residents 

 Jason Allison, professional ice hockey player
 Mikey Bustos, YouTuber
 Dalbello, recording artist, songwriter, multi-instrumentalist and voice actress
 Drake, rapper, singer, songwriter and actor
 Thomas J. Lawson, RCAF pilot and Chief of the Defence Staff 2012–15
 Mike Liut, professional ice hockey player
 Raine Maida, lead vocalist and founding member of Our Lady Peace
 Paul Martini, pairs figure skater and Olympian
 Adam Oates, Hall of Fame professional ice hockey player and former coach
 Bob Pulford, professional ice hockey player and executive
 Craig Ramsay, professional ice hockey coach and former player
 Donovan "Razor" Ruddock, professional boxer
 Joseph Tyrrell, geologist, cartographer and mining consultant
 Elwy Yost, TV Ontario host of Magic Shadows, Saturday Night at the Movies

In popular culture
 The 1980s children's TV series The Edison Twins'' was filmed and set in Weston.
 Parts of "The Rocker" were filmed in Weston on Queens Drive
 Parts of Stephen Kings remake "IT" were filmed around Weston
 Canadian rapper Drake mentions Weston in his 2018 hit single "God's Plan" and has a feature song "Weston Road Flows" on his 2016 album "Views"

See also 

 List of reeves of the former townships and villages in Toronto
 York South—Weston
 Weston Collegiate Institute
 Humber River
 Weston Road
 Canada Cycle & Motor Co. Ltd
 Knob Hill Farms
 Raymore Drive

References

External links 

 Weston Neighbourhood Profile from City of Toronto website
 Youtube video- Deindustrialization of Weston and Mount Dennis
 Lost Village of Weston

Neighbourhoods in Toronto
Metropolitan Toronto
Former municipalities in Toronto